Cooksbridge Meadow is a   nature reserve south of Fernhurst in Sussex. It is managed by the Sussex Wildlife Trust.

Most of this site is grassland but there is also a narrow strip of woodland and a stream. The meadows are grazed by sheep in order to keep the grass down and ensure a good display of flowers in the spring. Woodland flowers include sanicle, yellow archangel and purslane.

There is access by a footpath opposite the Kings Arms public house on the A286 road.

References

Sussex Wildlife Trust